The Battle of the Panaro (or Modena or Castelfranco) was a victory for King Joachim Murat's Neapolitan forces over a smaller Austrian force under Frederick Bianchi on 3 April 1815 early in the Neapolitan War. This defeat on the banks on the Panaro River, just south of Modena forced the Austrians to retreat behind the Po River.

Background 
When Naples declared war on Austria, Austrian troops were still gathering in Lombardy. Only a small force of about 6,600 men commanded by General Bianchi, who was stationed in the Duchy of Modena, were in position to check the Neapolitan advance. Murat with his main army of around 40,000 men had already established a main headquarters in Ancona and were marching north. Following a minor skirmish on 30 March near Cesena, the Austrians under Bianchi fell back to a new defensive line behind the Panaro River. This allowed the Neapolitans to capture Bologna on 2 April, from where they prepared another assault on the Austrians.

Battle 
On 3 April, one day after capturing Bologna, a Neapolitan division under the command of Michele Carrascosa attempted to cross the Panaro. After being driven back from two other bridges, the Neapolitans finally crossed the Panaro at Castelfranco Emilia and made a sweeping charge on Bianchi's position. As heavy fighting continued in the center of the Austrian position, Murat ordered a column under General Colletta to sweep left and push on the Austrian fight flank. Outnumbered, the Austrian right flank was turned and Bianchi was compelled to sound the retreat. With more Neapolitan troops arriving from Bologna, the Austrian retreated back to their lands behind the Po River. Following the battle, Carascosa and his troops immediately occupied the major towns of the Duchy of Modena: Modena, Reggio Emilia and Carpi.

References 
Capt. Robert Batty, An Historical Sketch of the Campaign of 1815, London (1820)
Details of battle at Clash of Steel

External links

Conflicts in 1815
Battles of the Neapolitan War
Battles involving Austria
Battles involving the Kingdom of Naples
Battles in Emilia-Romagna
1815 in Italy
1815 in the Austrian Empire
April 1815 events
Battles inscribed on the Arc de Triomphe
Joachim Murat